The Baylor Bears men's tennis team represents Baylor University in NCAA Division I college tennis. The team is part of the Big 12 Conference and plays home matches at the Hurd Tennis Center. The Bears are currently led by interim head coach Michael Woodson.

History
Men's tennis debuted at Baylor University in 1970, but the program did not see continued success until the arrival of Matt Knoll in 1997. After a 13–12 campaign in his inaugural year, Coach Knoll led the team to its first NCAA Tournament appearance in 1998. In 2000, the team won its first conference championship. The program defining moment was reached in 2004 when the Bears won their first NCAA championship.

The team has made the NCAA tournament each season since 1998. The Bears have been regular season conference champions 13 times and have gone on to also win the conference tournament in eight of those years.

After Knoll's resignation at the conclusion of the 2017-2018 season, Brian Boland was named director of tennis and head men's tennis coach on May 25, 2018.  In July 2020, Boland resigned following an investigation by university officials into inappropriate text messages he had sent to a student who had hoped to join Baylor's women's team.

Stadium

Baylor tennis plays their home matches at the Hurd Tennis Center, named after the Hurd family. Opened in 2000, the facility contains 12 outdoor courts, and a clubhouse with offices. The listed capacity of the center is 3,000, including amphitheater seating. There is chair-back seating along the baselines for 1,200.  Also, a LED scoreboard has been built in the middle of the front six courts, allowing an easier time for fans to keep track of several matches at once. The Bears also play at the Hawkins Indoor Tennis Center, completed in 2013. The $7 million building includes six courts and more than 34,000 square-feet of space.

The Hurd Tennis Center has hosted numerous postseason events since its construction, most notably the 2015 NCAA Championships. It has also hosted the first and second rounds of the NCAA tournament and the Big 12 Championships.

Year-by-year results (since 1997)

Former players
Benjamin Becker
Benedikt Dorsch
John Peers

Footnotes

References

External links